Sykes Racing is an Australian manufacturer of rowing shells. The boats are widely popular by Australian rowers from schools through to Olympians.

History
The company was founded in Geelong, Victoria, in 1966 by the Australian champion lightweight rower Jeff Sykes. Sykes saw the need for innovation in the Australian boat-building industry and set out to build world-class boats.

Sykes had been apprenticed to his father's boat-building business in Geelong.  In 1966, Sykes built his own racing shell to compete in the Australian Rowing Championships and this was the genesis of Sykes Racing. Sykes Racing initially focussed on smaller boats and had success as rowers of their sculls and pairs won Australian national championships. In 1973 the Western Australian senior men's eight had King's Cup success in a Sykes boat and from 1974 Sykes boats were being used in all boat classes for Australian representative crews.

The company's products are suitable for novice rowers through to world-class, elite athletes. The company has developed a reputation for developing high-class racing sculls. Since 1992, 75% of Australia's rowing medals from World Championships and Olympic Games have come from rowers using Sykes Racing shells. Sykes' first boat is still in existence today.

Types of boats
Sykes Racing uses three different composite materials, which include Honeycomb Carbon Composite Boats, Honeycomb Kevlar Boats, Honeycomb Glass Boats. These different materials are used in the eight boat types they produce, which are:
Single Sculls (1X)
Pairs - Coxless (2-)
Double Sculls (2X)
Fours - Coxless (4-)
Fours - Coxed (4+)
Quad Sculls - Coxless (4X) 
Quad Sculls - Coxed (4X+)
Eights (8+)

References

External links
Sykes Racing
Sykes Racing North America
Sykes Racing Japan

Rowing equipment manufacturers
Geelong